Julio José González Vela Alvizu (born 23 April 1991) is a Mexican professional footballer who plays as a goalkeeper for Liga MX club UNAM.

References

External links

1991 births
Living people
Mexican footballers
Association football goalkeepers
Santos Laguna footballers
Tampico Madero F.C. footballers
C.D. Veracruz footballers
Club Universidad Nacional footballers
Liga MX players
Ascenso MX players
Liga Premier de México players
Tercera División de México players
Sportspeople from Acapulco
Footballers from Guerrero